Iván Domínguez (born May 28, 1976 in Havana) is a Cuban professional road bicycle racer for the Franco MRI Racing Team. In 2009 Dominguez also known as "The Cuban Missile" acquired U.S. citizenship.

Dominguez originally rode for the Cuban National Team on the track and was a Pan-American Gold Medalist in 1997. He defected in 1998 to live with his uncle in Miami. He spoke no English and worked in a shoe factory before starting to become successful in local bike races in Miami.

His opportunity to return to high level bicycle racing came in 2000 via the elite amateur Cycle Science (FL) racing team.  The small team was built around him and toured in a refurbished bus from Florida to California to New England and back to Wisconsin before he signed his first professional contract in August.

He turned professional in 2001, when offered a spot on the Saturn Professional Cycling Team. In 2004, he switched to Colavita Olive Oil presented by Bolla Wines and he rode for Health Net Presented by Maxxis in 2005, before joining Toyota-United in 2006.  In November 2008 Rock Racing announced that they had reached a deal for Dominguez to ride for them the following year. On December 10, 2008, Fuji-Servetto announced that Dominguez had signed, causing Rock Racing to remove him from their roster, however as of June 2009 Dominguez has gone from Fuji-Servetto to Rock  Racing as one of their sprinters.

He was a sprinter and was widely regarded as one of the best sprinters racing in America. He highlighted this by winning Stage 7 of the 2007 Tour of California, out-sprinting future road race world champion Thor Hushovd.

Track Results

2002
1st, New York City Cycling Championship (NY)
1997
1st, Cuban National Champion, 4km Pursuit
2nd, Pan Am Games, 4km Team Pursuit
1996
1st, Pan Am Games, Madison

Major results

2008
Tour de Georgia
 1st Overall after 1st Stage
1st, Stage #1
2007
1st, USA Crits World Criterium Championship
1st, Stage #1 Tour of Missouri
1st, Stage #6 Tour of Missouri
1st, Sprint Competition Tour of Missouri
1st, Stage #3 Tour of Elk Grove
1st, Hanes Park Classic
1st, Wells Fargo Twilight Criterium
1st, Stage #4 Cascade Cycling Classic
1st, Stage #1 Joe Martin Stage Race
1st, Indio Grand Prix
1st, Garrett Lemire Memorial Grand Prix
1st, Quand Knopf Sequia Cycling Classic Criterium
1st, Merco Credit Union Cycling Classic Down Town Grand Prix
1st, Stage #7 Amgen Tour of California
1st, Roger Milliken Memorial Criterium
1st, Red Trolley Classic Criterium
2nd, Chris Thater Memorial
2nd, Stage #1 TTT International Tour de Toona
2nd, Chevron Manhatton Beach Grand Prix
3rd, Stage #4 Tour of Missouri
3rd, Merco Credit Union Cycling Classic Road Race
4th, Overall Tour of Elk Grove
4th, Stage #2 International Tour de Toona
4th, Stage #7 Tour de Georgia
5th, Stage #6 Tour de Georgia
5th, Stage #1 Tour de Georgia
7th, Stage #2 Tour of Elk Grove
8th, Stage #4 International Tour de Toona
8th, Stage #2 Amgen Tour of California
9th, Stage #4 Joe Martin Stage Race
10th, Infineon Cougar Mountain Classic Criterium
2006
1st, Men’s Pro 1/2 International Challenge (Downers Grove, IL)
1st, Walterboro Criterium
1st, Greenwood Criterium
1st, Overall USA Crit Series
2nd, Commerce Bank Philadelphia International Championship
2nd, Stage#1 Tri-Peaks Challenge
2nd, Sunny King Criterium
2nd, Historic Roswell Criterium
2nd, McLane Pacific Foothills Road Race
2nd, Central Valley Classic Criterium
3rd, Stage #2 Fitchburg Longsjo Classic
3rd, Overall Tri-Peaks Challenge
4th, Stage #1 Vuelta a Valencia Stage Race (Valencia, CA)
6th, Spartanburg Criterium
8th, Athens Twilight
9th, CapTech Classic
2005
1st, CSC Invitational (Arlington, VA)
1st, Stage #3, San Dimas Stage Race
1st, Stage #4, Vuelta Ciclista Independencia (Dominican Republic)
1st, Stage #5, Vuelta Ciclista Independencia (Dominican Republic)
2nd, Central Valley Classic Kearney Park Circuit Race
2nd, Central Valley Classic Tower District Criterium
2nd, Athens Twilight Criterium
3rd, Historic Roswell Criterium
3rd, Wachovia Invitational (Lancaster, PA)
2004
1st, Bank of America Invitational (Charlotte, NC)
1st, Stage #3 Tour of Connecticut
1st, Stage #1 GP de Beauce (Quebec)
1st, Stage #3 Redlands Cycling Classic (CA)
2nd, Points Competition Dodge Tour de Georgia
2nd, Stage #1 Dodge Tour de Georgia
2nd, Stage #2 Dodge Tour de Georgia
2nd, Stage #3 Dodge Tour de Georgia
3rd, Stage #4 Redlands Bicycle Classic
3rd, Stage #2 Valley of the Sun stage race
2003
1st, Festival of Speed (FL)
1st, Stage #4 Vuelta a Sinaloa (Sinaloa, Mexico)
2002
1st, New York City Cycling Championships (NY, NY)
1st, Stage #4 Fitchburg Longsjo Classic (Fitchburg, MA)
2nd, Sequoia Cycling Classic Criterium (Visalia, CA)
4th, Sequoia Cycling Classic Road Race (Exeter, CA)
2001
1st, PYA / Monarch Criterium
1st, Solano Bicycle Classic Circuit Race (CA)
3rd, McClane Pacific Classic Grand Prix
3rd, Sequoia Cycling Classic Downtown Criterium
3rd, Sequoia Cycling Classic Rocky Hill Road Race
2000
1st, Sunshine Cycling Classic

References

 Profile on VELOBIOS
 Profile on toyota-united.com
 Rock Racing Announces 2009 Roster

1976 births
American male cyclists
Living people
Sportspeople from Havana
Cuban male cyclists